The Soan River, also referred to as the Swan, Sawan, or Sohan, is a river in Punjab, Pakistan.

Location and geography 
The Soan River is a stream in the Pothohar or North Punjab region of Pakistan, and drains much of the water of Pothohar. It starts near the small village of Bun in the foothills of Patriata and Murree and provides water to the Simly Dam, which is a water reservoir for Islamabad. Near Pharwala Fort, it cuts through a high mountain range at a location called Soan Cut. As streams do not typically form across mountains of this height, it is likely that the Soan was there before the formation of this range. Ling stream, following a relatively long course through Lehtrar and Kahuta, joins the Soan near Sihala on the southern side of Village Gagri.

The Islamabad Highway crosses this stream near Sihala at the Kak Pul bridge. The Ling Stream joins the Soan river just before the Kak Pul. Two other streams, the Korang River and the Lai stream, join the Soan just before and after the Soan Bridge, respectively. After following a path along a big curve, the stream reaches the Kalabagh proposed Dam Site close to Pirpiyahi where it falls into the Indus river. There is a railway station by the name of Sohan and a railway bridge close by.  

Due to its mountainous course and shallow bed, it is rarely used for irrigation purposes. Chinese rahu, mahseer, snakehead, balm, and catfish species are the main inhabitants of the river, including many species of turtles and tortoises.

History 

The oldest evidence of life in Pakistan has been found in the Soan River valley ruled by the Sainswal tribe. It was here that some of the earliest signs of humans have been discovered during the excavations of prehistoric mounds. Some relics found in the Soan valley area during the excavation process are believed to have originated over 500,000 years ago, during the Stone Age.

Conservation status 
The excavation sites have been minimally conserved, leading to their risk of being damaged by both human activities and environmental causes.

The marine life of the river are currently endangered due to the discharge of chemicals of the Sihala Industrial State and effluent water of Rawalpindi city into it.

See also
 Soan Sakaser Valley
 Indus River
 Soan Culture

References

External links
Photo of fossils found in Soan valley

Rivers of Punjab (Pakistan)
Rigvedic rivers
Tributaries of the Indus River
Rivers of Pakistan